CON-CAN Movie Festival (CON-CAN) is an audience-interactive online international short movie festival which aims to “discover hidden creative talent from all over the world, enabling image creators and a global audience to share the underlying messages and sheer creativity expressed in profound short movie productions”. Founded in 2005, the short movie festival enables users to watch short movies for free on its site. The festival's award ceremony is held annually in Tokyo, Japan.

History 

The idea for the CON-CAN Movie Festival was founded by Masahiro Yoshino, CEO of Media Research, Inc., a Japanese company that specializes in IT consulting, translation, publishing and media arts. Media Research, Inc. launched the festival online in 2005. The name CON-CAN was first thought of in Japanese (魂観). CON(魂) is said to represent the soul and CAN(観) to represent viewers watching with “true appreciation”.

The first CON-CAN Movie Festival was held in 2005 with two types of awards; one, an Audience Award that is presented by viewers, and the other a “Grand Prix” award (awarded to the best short movie) and two “Tamashii” awards (special jury awards decided by the CON-CAN International Jury). A total of 151 short movies from 25 different countries were submitted. Since then, CON-CAN was reported to receive over 550 submissions from over 50 different countries in 2008.

Selection process

Once the submission deadline passes, the process of selecting the movies for the movie festival begins. The programming department at CON-CAN is responsible for a preliminary screening of the movies. The best 80 movies out of all the submitted movies are selected to be part of the movie festival and their directors are notified via email.

The movie festival then branches off into two parts. One part consists of the 80 movies being passed through a first round evaluation and judged by a domestic (Japanese) jury. These preliminary jury members select the best 20 movies to be considered for the final evaluation process. In the final evaluation round, international jury members selected by the CON-CAN staff select the top three nominations to be awarded the Grand Prix award (the best short movie) and the two Tamashii awards (special jury awards). The winner of the Grand Prix award and the two Tamashii award winners are invited to Tokyo with travel and accommodations paid for in order to attend the award ceremony. The award ceremony hosts famous people from the movie industry and notable news networks.

Another part consists of the 80 movies being categorized into four groups. Each group is independently displayed on CON-CAN's website. During this time, registered voters are able to watch free movies and animations, rate the movies and comment on them. The movie with the highest rating in each category is awarded an Audience Award.

Awards

Grand Prix Winners

Tamashii Award Winners

Audience Award Winners

Jury

The international jury which chooses the three best movies during the final evaluation round features famous people from the movie industry. Below are the juries from previous years.

The 6th CON-CAN Movie Festival

Chris Fujiwara (Film critic)
Jukka-Pekka Laakso (Chairman of the Tampere Film Festival)
Ngo Phuong Lan (Chairperson of the Council of Theory and Criticism at the Vietnam Cinema Association)
Naomi Kawase (Filmmaker)
Matthieu Darras (Programmer of the Cannes Critics' Week)

The 5th CON-CAN Movie Festival

Chris Fujiwara (Film critic)
Jukka-Pekka Laakso (Chairman of the Tampere Film Festival)
Kitaro Kanematsu (President of the Japanese Society of Cinematographers (Japan))
Michael Renov (Professor of Critical Studies and Associate Dean of the University of Southern California School of Cinematic Arts)
Hui-jun Zhang (President of the Beijing Film Academy)

The 4th CON-CAN Movie Festival

Jukka-Pekka Laakso (Chairman of the Tampere Film Festival)
Chihong (Lecturer at the Beijing Film Academy)
Vincent Malausa (Film critic for Cahiers du cinéma)
Tapan Sinha (Film director for the Bengali film industry)
Chris Fujiwara (Film critic)

The 3rd CON-CAN Movie Festival
Jean-Michel Frodon (Journalist, film critic and cinema historian)
Masahiro Kobayashi (Film director in Japan)
Jukka-Pekka Laakso (Chairman of the Tampere Film Festival)
Dennis Lim (Film critic and film editor for Village Voice)
Amir Naderi (Film director in Iran/USA)

The 2nd CON-CAN Movie Festival

Babak Payami (Film director in Iran/Canada)
Dennis Lim (Film critic and film editor for Village Voice)
Hou Hsiao-hsien (Film director in Taiwan)
Jean-Michel Frodon (Journalist, film critic and cinema historian)
Jukka-Pekka Laakso (Chairman of the Tampere Film Festival)
Peter Millynn (Production executive at the Australian Film Television and Radio School)
Teruyo Nogami (Production manager of Kurosawa Production Co. (Japan))

The 1st CON-CAN Movie Festival

Babak Payami (Film director in Iran/Canada)
Dennis Lim (Film critic and film editor for Village Voice)
Fei Zhao (Professor at the Beijing Film Academy)
Jean-Michel Frodon (Journalist, film critic and cinema historian)
Jukka-Pekka Laakso (Chairman of the Tampere Film Festival)
Peter Millynn (Production executive at the Australian Film Television and Radio School)
Shoichiro Sasaki (Director of Audio and Visual Images)

References

External links 
CON-CAN Movie Festival Official Website
Japan Times article on CON-CAN Movie Festival
CON-CAN at the Directory of International Film and Video Festivals 

Film festivals in Tokyo
Internet film festivals
Short film festivals
2005 establishments in Japan
Film festivals established in 2005